Stefan Edberg was the defending champion, but lost in the final against Goran Ivanišević. The score was 6–7(5–7), 6–3, 6–4, 6–4.

Seeds

Draw

Finals

Top half

Bottom half

References

External links
 Official results archive (ATP)
 Official results archive (ITF)

1992 in German tennis
1992 ATP Tour
1992 Singles